Gilbert Clain (17 August 1941 – 21 April 2021) was a Réunionese sculptor.

Biography
He became one of the most famous sculptors in Réunion, primarily working with wood, basalt, and coral.

Gilbert Clain died in Îlet Furcy on 21 April 2021 at the age of 79.

References

Sculptors from Réunion
1941 births
2021 deaths
People from Saint-Louis, Réunion